The Rumpi mouse shrew (Myosorex rumpii) is a Myosoricinae shrew found only on the Rumpi Hills, Cameroon. It is listed as a critically endangered species due to habitat loss and a restricted range.

References

Endemic fauna of Cameroon
Myosorex
Mammals described in 1968
Fauna of the Cameroonian Highlands forests
Taxa named by Henri Heim de Balsac